Rath City was a frontier town that existed for fewer than five years, and is now a ghost town. The town was located on the Double Mountain Fork Brazos River, 14 miles northwest of Hamlin in southern Stonewall County, Texas, United States.

History
The town was founded in 1876. Its original establishment was meant to capitalize on the buffalo trade, and it was Stonewall County's first settlement. In 1877, the town housed a store, two saloons, a dance hall, and a few tents and dugouts. The town's namesake was Charles Rath, whose store, built in 1875, was the structure around which the village grew. A declining buffalo population ended the settlement, and it was abandoned in 1880.

Rath City and Native Americans
In February 1877, after buffalo hunter Marshall Sewell was killed by Native Americans, Rath City became a rallying point for over 500 frontiersmen.  A group of 46 men left Rath City in pursuit of a Comanche war party led by Black Horse, in a campaign known as the Buffalo Hunters' War or Staked Plains War. The men pursued the Comanche to a site in present-day Lubbock. A battle ensued on March 18, 1877, at Yellow House Canyon; its results were inconclusive. The hunters returned to Rath City, thus ending one of the last Indian campaigns on the southern plains.

See also
Canyon Valley, Texas
Double Mountains (Texas)
List of ghost towns in Texas
Llano Estacado
Salt Fork Brazos River

References

External links
Rath City, Texas on Ghosttowns.com

Ghost towns in North Texas
Geography of Stonewall County, Texas
Populated places established in 1876
1876 establishments in Texas